Fredric Aasbø (born 18 August 1985) is a professional drifter and stunt driver originally from Ski, Norway. He now competes in the Formula Drift Championship. In 2022, Aasbø became a three-time Formula Drift champion, having won the title in 2015, 2021, and 2022. He also holds claim to the most wins of any driver in series history (as of January 2023). He finished runner-up in the 2016, 2017, 2018, and 2019 championship chases.

Career 
Aasbø won the 2007 and 2008 Nordic Drifting Championship titles as a privateer competing in his native Scandinavia before making his U.S. debut at a global drifting invitational in 2008. In 2010, he ran his first full season of U.S. competition and won the Formula Drift 'Rookie of the Year' award. In 2014, he won the Formula Drift Asia title, and finished runner-up in the U.S. Formula Drift Pro Championship. He scored the Formula Drift Pro Championship title in 2015 with a record of four wins in seven rounds, as well as the Formula Drift World Championship. The same year, he was also awarded the FIA's Driver of the Year for Norway – an honor he accepted from Norwegian World Rally Champion Petter Solberg.

After starting his career as a privateer racer in a Toyota Supra, he joined the Papadakis Racing squad in 2011 as a replacement for driver Tanner Foust (who had announced his departure from drifting). In 2012, he won the "Pro" category of the Toyota Pro/Celebrity Race. In the past two years, he has debuted two different Toyota hatchbacks in the Formula Drift series. In 2018, Papadakis Racing introduced the Rockstar Energy Drink / Nexen Tire Toyota Corolla Hatchback. A year earlier, they finished second in the championship in a similar liveried Toyota IM. From 2010 to 2016, he drove a Scion tC in the United States and, currently races a Toyota GT86 in Europe.

He is also a stunt driver whose work has most notably been featured in the Norwegian action film Børning.

His girlfriend Hunter Taylor is now a rookie drifter as well.

References

External links
Official site

1985 births
Living people
People from Ski, Norway
Norwegian racing drivers
Formula D drivers
Drifting drivers
Sportspeople from Viken (county)